The 2017 EuroCup Finals were the concluding games of the 2016–17 EuroCup season, the 15th season of Europe's secondary club basketball tournament organised by Euroleague Basketball, the ninth season since it was renamed from the ULEB Cup to the EuroCup, and the first season under the title sponsorship name of 7DAYS. The first leg was played at the Fuente de San Luis in Valencia, Spain, the second leg was played at the Martín Carpena in Málaga, Spain, on 31 March 2017 and the third leg was played at the Fuente de San Luis in Valencia, Spain, between Spanish sides Unicaja and Valencia Basket.

It was the first ever Finals appearance ever of Unicaja, after 15 seasons in EuroLeague and it was the third ever final appearance in any European competition after two consecutive finals in Korać Cup. For Valencia Basket, it was its fifth Finals appearance, after winning three of the previous four. Also, it was the seventh ever final appearance, including two losses in finals of the Saporta Cup. It was also the second EuroCup Finals that both finalists were from the same country.

Unicaja won the Finals 1–2, and qualified for the 2017–18 EuroLeague.

Venues
The Fuente de San Luis was the first leg venue and, if necessary, the third leg venue as Valencia Basket venue. The arena was originally built in 1983. Valencia Basket started to play its games in the arena in 1987. The arena was also used as the home arena of the women's basketball team, Ros Casares Valencia, and the futsal team Valencia FS. In April 2010, La Fonteta hosted the 2009–10 EuroLeague Women Final Four, where Ros Casares Valencia was defeated in the final by Spartak Moscow Region. In 2016, Valencia Basket financed the renovation of the arena with €500,000, and also installed a new €150,000 center-hung scoreboard.

The Martín Carpena was the second leg venue as Unicaja venue. Martín Carpena arena opened in 1999. The arena originally had a seating capacity of 9,743 spectators, and an area of around 22,000 square meters. In 2007, a project was proposed to expand the capacity of the venue to 17,000 spectators, due to the high demand for seats and tickets by fans of Unicaja. Ultimately, the expansion project was approved, but to a new capacity of 13,000 spectators, rather than the originally planned 17,000. The expansion project was then scheduled to be completed in separate phases. The first expansion phase, which was completed in 2010, increased the seating capacity from 9,743 to 11,300.

Road to the Finals

Note: In the table, the score of the finalist is given first (H = home; A = away).

First leg
Bojan Dubljević became the all-time leading scorer in EuroCup history in the second quarter when he passed the mark of 1,189 which was set by teammate Rafa Martínez.

Second leg

Third leg
Alen Omić was disqualified in the third quarter for entering the court to prevent an altercation. In the last quarter, Unicaja was trailing by 13 when it came back with an 18–0 run to win the title.

Unicaja was the first newcomer to win the EuroCup title since Hapoel Jerusalem in 2003–04. Joan Plaza became the third coach to have won multiple EuroCup titles.

Finals MVP

See also
2017 EuroLeague Final Four
2017 Basketball Champions League Final Four
2017 FIBA Europe Cup Finals

References

External links
Official website

Finals
2017